Phyla-Vell is a  character, a superhero appearing in American comic books published by Marvel Comics. Created by Peter David and Paul Azaceta, the character first appeared in Captain Marvel vol. 5 #16 (January 2004). The character has also gone by the names Quasar, Captain Marvel and Martyr at various points in her history.

Publication history
Phyla-Vell first appeared in Captain Marvel vol. 5 #16 and was created by writer Peter David and artist Paul Azaceta. She is introduced as Phyla-Vell and is the daughter of Elysius, the genetically engineered woman beloved by the late Mar-Vell. When Genis-Vell went mad and destroyed and recreated the world, he created a new universe where everything was mostly the same but for some subtle differences. She was the second child created by Elysius, who also created Gen-Vell, from Mar-Vell's DNA and for a time, Phyla wore the name Captain Marvel.

The character appeared as Quasar after the previous Quasar died, in Annihilation: Conquest, featuring in her own, self-titled mini-series written by Christos Gage. Leading on from this appearance she was part of the line-up for the 2008 Guardians of the Galaxy team.

She made a deal to save the life of her partner Moondragon; in exchange she became the Avatar of Oblivion, and she started calling herself Martyr. She remained part of the Guardians of the Galaxy team until her death.

Her name is derived from the scientific classification phylum, one of the levels of organization (taxa) for classifying life. This is a reference to the fact that her brother Genis-Vell's name comes from genus, one of the other classifications for life forms.

Fictional character biography

After Genis-Vell, then known as Captain Marvel, previously destroyed and recreated the universe, the "new" version was subtly altered with Phyla-Vell's existence being one of the changes. It is revealed that she is the second artificially created offspring of Captain Mar-Vell who was created by her mother Elysius in the "new" universe because her first attempt (Genis-Vell) had been so successful. Initially her origin conflicted with previously established storylines, but this is resolved in Captain Marvel vol. 5 #18 (Feb. 2004).

She fights her brother Genis-Vell, who was insane at the time, in the process helping to restore his sanity. She then tries to lay claim to the "Captain Marvel" title, though her brother refuses to give it up. Phyla is next seen at the trial of Starfox.

The Captain Marvel (vol. 5) series heavily hinted that Phyla-Vell is a lesbian, and in #25 (September 2004) the character admits that she is attracted to Moondragon and invites her on a tour of the "spiral nebula near Renault VII". Before Moondragon can accept the two wander through a portal.

Annihilation

Phyla later appeared during Annihilation where she had been visiting her father's grave with Moondragon when the pair were attacked by Thanos who ripped off Moondragon's ear and gave it to Phyla, telling her to go to Drax the Destroyer and how his actions would determine Moondragon's fate shortly before teleporting away with Moondragon. Drax has indicated he will not be stopping his pursuit of Thanos.

Phyla then goes with Nova and Star-Lord to lead a final battle against Annihilus, being saved at the last second by a massive energy wave caused by the just freed Galactus, which left only the three heroes and Annihilus as survivors.  Ultimately in the battle, Phyla manages to steal away the quantum bands that Annihilus took from Quasar, weakening him and allowing Nova to finally bring an end to the Annihilation Wave.  She is then seen re-united with Moondragon, and deciding it's up to her to become the new Quasar.

Annihilation: Conquest – Quasar

Phyla had her own mini-series as the new Quasar, stating July through October 2007, called Annihilation: Conquest – Quasar. The series was written by Christos Gage (who wrote Union Jack), penciled by Mike Lilly. Phyla is finding it hard to follow the footsteps of the former Quasar and also to follow in the Mar-Vell family's footsteps. The story is a lot about her trying to handle this power, and seeing if she can contain it.  She's on a quest, and the object of the quest has real importance, not only to her, but to the entire storyline. Phylla and her lover Moondragon follow a voice to find the saviour for the Kree race who is attacked by the Phalanx. In the end it turns out 'the voice' is the Supreme Intelligence of the Kree; thanks to the Supreme Intelligence they find a cocoon, in which Adam Warlock is restoring. The cocoon breaks open and Phyla and Moondragon ask Warlock to help them fight against the Phalanx. This story was continued in the main mini-series Annihilation: Conquest.

Guardians of the Galaxy

Following Annihilation, she joins the new Guardians of the Galaxy. While helping Drax search for Cammi, an Earth girl who he had taken into space before the Annihilation War, they consult a psychic to get a lead on Cammi's whereabouts only to be informed that Moondragon was trying to contact them. They attempt to consult Mentor, who apparently kills them. Mentor sends Phyla and Drax to Oblivion where they encounter Maelstrom and the Dragon of the Moon. After losing the Quantum Bands to Maelstrom Phyla is offered as a sacrifice to the Dragon so that Maelstrom can be in its good graces. While inside the dragon she apparently makes a deal in exchange for Heather Douglas. The dragon then releases them, with Phyla wearing a new red and black costume adorned with skulls and wielding a new sword, and they return to the world of the living where Phyla refuses to elaborate on the deal that she made with the Dragon. It is later learned from Maelstrom that she agreed to become the new avatar of Oblivion.

Martyr
Now calling herself Martyr, Phyla-Vell is a more abrasive and aggressive figure. When the Guardians attempted to negotiate with the Inhumans to stop the War of Kings, she ruined the attempt by taking Inhuman princess Crystal hostage instead; this led to battle between the Inhumans and Guardians, while she continued to escalate. Eventually, the Inhumans would try to end the war by detonating a weapon that shattered space itself, creating a multiversal Fault.

When Adam Warlock stopped the Fault's growth by using a redundant timeline, one where he became the villainous Magus, Phyla-Vell revealed that her deal with Oblivion was to kill "the Avatar of Life" and she'd know what to do when the time came. Knowing he would now become Magus, she ran Adam through but this failed to stop his transformation. Several of the Guardians, then stranded in the year 3009, were then sent back in time to stop Magus' creation and Phyla was prevented from making her move. This time when Warlock was transformed, she engaged him in combat - but Magus magically teleported her own sword from her hands and slew her with it.

However, Phyla was revealed to still be alive, along with Mantis, Gamora, Cosmo and Major Victory, but trapped in suspended animation and prisoners of the Magus. She then breaks free and frees the other Guardians, but after a fierce fight she is misled by Maelstrom into freeing Thanos, who was concealed inside a cocoon. When the two teams of Guardians reunite, Phyla-Vell is reported as the first victim of Thanos' rampage, her remains seen by Mantis but never shown on panel. She is later mourned by the Guardians on Knowhere.

Phyla-Vell is later shown in Hell when Thanos and Deadpool venture there in search of the missing Death.

Gamora later discovers Phyla trapped inside the Soul Gem alongside Adam Warlock. When Kang the Conqueror later shows Warlock a vision of the future, Phyla is seen as one of the heroes who has been defeated by the mysterious villain that has collected all six Infinity Gems.

Powers and abilities
Phyla-Vell has superhuman strength, speed, agility, durability, and reflexes. She can fire energy blasts and fly. She also acts like an "energy sponge," absorbing any energy attacks directed at her and returning them as energy blasts. She has cosmic awareness and is a proficient fighter.

She then came into possession of the Quantum Bands formerly owned by Wendell Vaughn. The Bands grant vast energy manipulation powers, such as absorbing and transforming energy on a stellar level, forming solid energy constructs and forcefields, allowing for space travel and providing protection from telepathic attacks.

While searching for Heather Douglas, Phyla lost the Quantum Bands to the villain Maelstrom. She has gained unknown new powers by becoming the new avatar of Oblivion. However, Wendell has stated that her Quantum Sword will still draw power from the Quantum Bands and that they will always be a part of her.

Reception

Accolades 

 In 2014, Screen Rant included Phyla-Vell in their "12 Characters We Want To See In 'Guardians of the Galaxy' Sequels" list.
 In 2014, Autostraddle ranked Phyla-Vell 2nd in their "11 Female Superheroes I Wish Marvel Would Make Movies About" list.
 In 2016, Comicbook.com included Phyla-Vell in their "5 Awesome Guardians Of The Galaxy Who Aren't In The Marvel Cinematic Universe " list.
 In 2017, IGN included Phyla-Vell in their "7 Characters Who Should Join Guardians of the Galaxy Vol. 3" list.
 In 2017, Autostraddle ranked Phyla-Vell 6th in their "7 LGBT Women Who Need to Appear in the MCU Immediately" list.
 In 2017, Den of Geek ranked Phyla-Vell 15th in their "Guardians of the Galaxy 3: 50 Marvel Characters We Want to See" list.
 In 2018, CBR.com ranked Phyla-Vell 4th in their "25 Most Powerful Guardians Of The Galaxy" list, 7th in their "Marvel's 20 Most Powerful Cosmic Heroes" list, and 13th in their "25 Fastest Characters In The Marvel Universe" list.
 In 2019, CBR.com ranked Phyla-Vell 6th in their "All The Captain Marvels" list, 8th in their "20 Powerful Female Marvel Characters We Hope To See In The MCU's Phase Four" list, and 9th in their "Every Captain Marvel Ever" list.
 In 2019, Screen Rant ranked Phyla-Vell 6th in their "10 LGBTQA Characters Who Should Be Introduced To The MCU" list.
 In 2020, CBR.com ranked Phyla-Vell 5th in their "The Kree: The 10 Most Powerful Members Of The Race" list.
 In 2022, SlashFilm included Phyla-Vell in their "10 Guardians Of The Galaxy Comic Characters We Want To See In The MCU" list.2
 In 2022, Screen Rant ranked Phyla-Vell 8th in their "15 Most Powerful Guardians Of The Galaxy Members In The Comics" list, and included her in their "15 Most Powerful Versions Of Captain Marvel From The Comics" list, and in their "10 Best Members Of The Guardians Of The Galaxy Still Missing From The MCU" list.

Other versions

Infinity Countdown 
During Infinity Countdown, when Gamora was collecting the Infinity Stones, an alternate version of Phyla-Vell and Moondragon from Earth-TRN707 arrived on the Prime Earth to get their universe's Reality Stone. After acquiring their Reality Stone, Moondragon deleted her memories of the event.

In other media

Television
 Phyla-Vell appears in The Avengers: Earth's Mightiest Heroes, voiced by Moira Quirk. In the episode "Michael Korvac", she appears as a member of the Guardians of the Galaxy at the time they are pursuing Michael Korvac.
 Phyla-Vell appears in Guardians of the Galaxy, voiced by Ming-Na Wen.

Video games
 Phyla-Vell is a playable character in Marvel Avengers Alliance, she was added in Season 32 as an Adamantium League reward hero.
Phyla-Vell / Quasar appears as a Toy box townsperson in Disney Infinity 2.0 and Disney Infinity 3.0.
Phyla-Vell is a playable character and appears as a shifter bio in the Guardians of the Galaxy Epic Quest of Marvel: Future Fight.
Phyla-Vell is a playable character in Marvel Strike Force, she can be played along with Adam Warlock and other Infinity Watch characters with whom she has synergies with.

Collected editions

References

External links
Quasar (Phyla-Vell) at the Marvel Universe Wiki
Phyla-Vell (Earth-616) at the Marvel Database
Phyla-Vell at the Appendix to the Handbook of the Marvel Universe

Annihilation: Conquest preview on AfterEllen.com
Phyla-Vell at Captain Marvel Culture

Captain Marvel (Marvel Comics)
Comics characters introduced in 2003
Characters created by Peter David
Fictional avatars
Fictional characters with superhuman durability or invulnerability
Fictional lesbians
Fictional swordfighters in comics
Guardians of the Galaxy characters
Kree
Marvel Comics aliens
Marvel Comics characters with superhuman strength
Marvel Comics extraterrestrial superheroes
Marvel Comics female superheroes
Marvel Comics LGBT superheroes